Michal Maier (born May 7, 1964) is a Czech sailor. He competed at five consecutive Summer Olympics in the Finn class: 1996 (14th position) 2000 (19th), 2004 (15th), 2008 (25th) and 2012 (21st). 

References

External links

1964 births
Living people
Czech male sailors (sport)
Olympic sailors of the Czech Republic
Sailors at the 1996 Summer Olympics – Finn
Sailors at the 2000 Summer Olympics – Finn
Sailors at the 2004 Summer Olympics – Finn
Sailors at the 2008 Summer Olympics – Finn
Sailors at the 2012 Summer Olympics – Finn